Hillcrest, California may refer to:
 Hillcrest, Los Angeles County, California
 Hillcrest, San Diego, California
 Hillcrest, Shasta County, California